The cuisine of the Americas is made up of a variety of food preparation styles.

North America

North American cuisine consists of foods native to or popular in countries of North America, such as Canadian cuisine, American cuisine, Mexican cuisine, and Central American cuisine. North American cuisines display influence from many international cuisines, including Native American cuisine, Jewish cuisine, Asian cuisine, and especially European cuisine.
As a broad, geo-culinary term, North American cuisine also includes Central American and Caribbean cuisines. These regions are part of North America, so these regional cuisines also fall within the penumbra of North American cookery.

The term "regional" is somewhat ambiguous, however, since, for example, the cuisine of Puerto Rico can differ markedly from Cuban cuisine; Mexican cuisine spills across the border into the Tex-Mex and Mexi-Cali "sub-cuisines"; and the cuisines of Michigan and Ontario have more in common with each other than either has with the cuisines of Manitoba or Iowa.

Countries

 American cuisine
 Anguillan cuisine
 Antigua and Barbuda cuisine
 Barbadian cuisine
 Bahamian cuisine
 Belizean cuisine
 Bermudian cuisine
 Canadian cuisine
 Cayman Island cuisine
 Costa Rican cuisine
 Cuban cuisine
 Dominican Republic cuisine
 Dominica cuisine
 Greenlandic cuisine
 Grenadan cuisine
 Guatemalan cuisine
 Haitian cuisine
 Honduran cuisine
 Jamaican cuisine
 Mexican cuisine
 Nicaraguan cuisine
 Panamanian cuisine
 Puerto Rican cuisine
 Saint Lucian cuisine
 Salvadoran cuisine
 Trinidad and Tobago cuisine
 Virgin Islands cuisine

South America

Some of the richest products of South American cuisine come from the middle of the continent, the Amazon basin. In countries like Peru, there is a strong influence of the Inca and their cuisine. Potatoes are frequently grown as a result of this, and also plants such as quinoa. On the western coast of South America lies the Pacific Ocean, which provides a large array of seafood. Many plains are also on this continent, which are rich for growing food in abundance. In the Patagonia region south of Argentina, many people produce lamb and venison. King crab is typically caught at the southern end of the continent. Antarctic krill has just recently been discovered and is now considered a fine dish. Tuna and tropical fish are caught all around the continent, but Easter Island is one place where they are found in abundance. Lobster is also caught in great quantities from Juan Fernández. In Brazil, their most traditional dish is the feijoada.

Countries

 Argentine cuisine
 Bolivian cuisine
 Brazilian cuisine
 Chilean cuisine
 Colombian cuisine
 Ecuadorian cuisine
 Guyanese cuisine
 Paraguayan cuisine
 Peruvian cuisine
 Surinamese cuisine
 Uruguayan cuisine
 Venezuelan cuisine

References

See also
 Latin American cuisine
 List of cuisines of the Americas

 
Americas
Americas